The Hamilton County Fair, formerly known as the Carthage Fair, is the county fair of Hamilton County, Ohio. It was held annually by the Hamilton County Agricultural Society at the Hamilton County Fairgrounds in Cincinnati's Carthage neighborhood. It is the oldest county fair in Ohio, first held in 1820 on the Ezekiel Hutchinson farm and beginning in 1855 at the Fairgrounds location. It was the first fair west of the Allegheny Mountains to offer cash awards in livestock competitions. The fair was canceled in 1861 and 1862 due to the American Civil War, in 2018 due to rain and flash flooding, and in 2020 due to the COVID-19 pandemic. It was postponed in 2021 until Fall 2022 for multiple reasons, " ... limited availability of vendors, volunteers, and public sanitation and safety equipment, coupled with vendors’ ongoing concerns for public health ...", but was then cancelled due to Hurricane Ian. In the 1970s, the racetrack had to be relocated to make room for Ronald Reagan Cross County Highway's West Side extension. The 2022 fair was to be held at a new location on McDonald Farm in Sale Creek.

References

External links
 
 

Fairgrounds in Ohio
Agricultural shows in the United States
Parks in Cincinnati
Festivals in Cincinnati
1820 establishments in Ohio